Three for Jamie Dawn is a 1956 American film starring Laraine Day and Ricardo Montalban.

Cast
Laraine Day as Sue Lorenz
Ricardo Montalban as George Lorenz
Richard Carlson as Marv Random
June Havoc as Lorrie Delacourt
Maria Palmer as Julia Karek
Eduard Franz as Anton Karek
Regis Toomey as Murph
Scotty Beckett as Gordon Peters
 Marilyn Simms as Jamie Dawn

Production
Filming started 1 February 1956.

References

External links
Three for Jamie Dawn at IMDb
Three for Jamie Dawn at TCMDB

1956 films
1956 crime drama films
Allied Artists films
American black-and-white films
American courtroom films
American crime drama films
Films directed by Thomas Carr
Films scored by Walter Scharf
Juries in fiction
1950s English-language films
1950s American films